Oleksandra Mikhailovna Bilozerska-Kulish (Ukrainian: Олекса́ндра Михай́лівна Білозе́рська-Кулі́ш; 5 May 1828 – 6 July 1911), who commonly wrote under the pseudonym Hanna Barvinok, was a Ukrainian writer and folklorist. Considered one of the most important writers in Ukraine, she was the first female writer of modern Ukrainian literature and became a pioneer of ethnographic realism in Ukrainian writing.

In addition to her better-known pseudonym of Hanna Barvinok, she also wrote under the name A. Nečuj-Viter. She was married to the writer Panteleimon Kulish and was the sister of Vasyl and  Bilozersky.

Biography 

Barvinok was born on 5 May 1828 as Alexandra Mikhailovna Bilozerska in the village of Motronivka in the Chernigov Governorate, an administrative subdivision of the Left-bank Ukraine in the Russian Empire (now part of modern-day Borzna in the Chernihiv Oblast of Ukraine). While she was young, the city had frequent fires, which eventually caused their family home to burn down.

Barvinok's family owned land in Motronivka. Her father was Mikhail Bilozersky, a Marshal of Nobility for the local area. He had a reputation for being a freethinker and was interested in modern Ukrainian literature. Barvinok's mother was Paraska Hryhorivna Kostenetska, the daughter of a Cossack soldier. Her mother was interested in traditional Ukrainian customs and songs.

Barvinok had brothers named Vasyl and Mykola, and sisters named Lyuba and Nadiya, who all grew up to become prominent figures in Ukraine. Her brother Vasyl became a Ukrainian public and literary figure. Her other brother, Mykola, became a folklorist and ethnographer. Her sister Lyuba was the muse and lover of the poet, and her sister Nadiya later became the mother of writer .

Alexandra and her sisters studied at private boarding schools, which she attended from 1834 to 1842.

At the age of 15, Barvinok met the writer Panteleimon Kulish in Motronivka, when he was invited there by her brother Vasyl. Four years later, on 24 January 1847, Panteleimon and Barvinok married.

The newly married couple traveled to Warsaw. About four months after their marriage, the Brotherhood of Saints Cyril and Methodius was broken up and her husband was arrested and sent to Saint Petersburg.

After the arrest of her husband, Barvinok had a miscarriage and became unable to have children again. She then moved to Tula, following her exiled husband.

From 1854 onwards, after their exile ended, Barvinok and her husband lived in Saint Petersburg.

In 1883, the Kulishs settled back in Motronivka.

When the manuscript of the Ukrainian translation of the Bible, which Kulish had been working on for 25 years, burned, she persuaded him to start working again.

After her husband's death, Barvinok organized and memorialized Panteleimon's literary creations. She published his writings and compiled a multi-volume series of all of his life's works, although only five of the planned 22 volumes were ever published. She also established the Panteleimon Kulish Museum in his memory.

Barvinok died on 6 July 1911 in Motronivka. She was buried next to her husband in her former farm in the town.

Writing 
Barvinok wrote more than 30 stories during her lifetime, the main characters of which were mostly women. She began as a prose writer and mainly wrote about folk life, specifically among families and peasants, and was particularly drawn to the "fate of the peasant woman".

She was the founder and leader of ethnographic realism in Ukrainian literature, and based her writing off of her personal ethnographic notes. While recording her observations on a trip to Warsaw, she began collecting materials for her initial works.

Barvinok began writing stories in the 1840s, with her first work titled "The Jewish Serf". Her works began to be published in 1858, under a pseudonym chosen by her husband: Hanna Barvinok.

In her literary works, Barvinok's attentions were also focused on the problems of family and domestic relations, including family tyranny ("House Disaster", 1861), the joyless fate of being with a drunken man ("Women's Poverty", 1887), and the drama of forced marriage ("Father's Mistake" 1902). The writer also created figures of strong-willed women ("Victory", 1887; "Youth Struggle", 1902). Her language was colorful, figurative, and full of folk proverbs. Some of her more figurative stories were "Mermaid", "Flower with tears, tears with flowers", "Disaster is not without good", "Autumn summer". Using Chernihiv and Poltava dialects, as well as knowledge of rural customs and folklore, she wrote the drama "Mother's Revenge".

Her writings were published in multiple collections and anthologies, including posthumous publications. Ukrainian writer Borys Hrinchenko praised her work, calling Barvinok "the poet of women's fate."

Legacy 

 exist in several settlements of Ukraine.

The most complete collection of her work was published in the 2002 book  (English: Hanna Barvinok), edited by Volodymyr Yatsyuk and Vasyl Shenderovsky. In 2018, the National Writers' Union of Ukraine held an event in Kyiv to celebrate Barvinok's 190th anniversary.

References

Further reading 
  - 1966, page 147
 "Барвінок Ганна" in the  - 1988, page 129
  - Chernihiv, 2001
 Panteleimon Kulish returned to his wife after an affair with Mark Vovchko  - Gazeta.ua, 6 August 2009
  - Ivan Korsak, 2015

Ukrainian women
Ukrainian women writers
Commons category link is on Wikidata
1911 deaths
1828 births
Russian poets of Ukrainian descent
Ukrainian writers
19th-century Ukrainian writers
20th-century Ukrainian writers
People from Chernigov Governorate
Folklorists from the Russian Empire
Ukrainian feminists